The Allouez Pump House is located in Allouez, Wisconsin.

History
Construction of the pump house began in 1925 after the water department in Allouez was established the previous year. In 1940, a garage was added on to it.

References

Government buildings on the National Register of Historic Places in Wisconsin
National Register of Historic Places in Brown County, Wisconsin
Mediterranean Revival architecture in Wisconsin